The Kuntillet Ajrud inscriptions are a series of inscriptions found at Kuntillet Ajrud. Many are religious in nature, invoking  Yahweh, El and Baal, and two include the phrases "Yahweh of Samaria and his Asherah" (or "Yahweh protect and his Asherah") and "Yahweh of Teman and his Asherah." 

The inscriptions were discovered during excavations in 1975-76, during the Israeli occupation of the Sinai Peninsula, but were not published in full until 2012.

Interpretation

The inscriptions found refer not only to Yahweh but to ʾEl and Baʿal, and two include the phrases "Yahweh of Samaria and his Asherah" and "Yahweh of Teman and his Asherah."

The references to Samaria (capital of the kingdom of Israel) and Teman (in Edom) suggest that Yahweh had a temple in Samaria, while raising questions about the relationship between Yahweh and Kaus, the national god of Edom. The 'asherah' in question is most likely a cultic object, although the relationship of this object (a stylised tree perhaps) to Yahweh and to the goddess Asherah, consort of ʾEl, is unclear. It has been suggested that the Israelites may have considered Asherah as the consort of Baʿal, due to the anti-Asherah ideology that was influenced by the  Deuteronomistic Historians, at the later period of the kingdom. Also, it has been suggested by several scholars  that there is a relationship between the position of the gəḇīrā in the royal court and the worship (orthodox or not) of Asherah. In a potsherd inscription of blessings from "Yahweh and his Asherah", there appears a cow feeding its calf.

Bibliography
 Puech, Émile. “LES INSCRIPTIONS HÉBRAÏQUES DE KUNTILLET ‘AJRUD (SINAÏ).” Revue Biblique (1946-) 121, no. 2 (2014): 161–94

References

Hebrew inscriptions
Archaeological discoveries in Egypt
Yahweh
Baal
Asherah
El (deity)
1975 archaeological discoveries
History of the Sinai Peninsula